Meg 2: The Trench is an upcoming science fiction action film directed by Ben Wheatley, and written by Dean Georgaris, and Jon and Erich Hoeber, based on the 1999 book The Trench by Steve Alten. Serving as a sequel to the 2018 film The Meg, the film stars Jason Statham, Sienna Guillory, and Cliff Curtis.

Meg 2: The Trench is scheduled to be released by Warner Bros. Pictures in the United States, on August 4, 2023.

Cast
 Jason Statham as Jonas Taylor
 Sienna Guillory
 Cliff Curtis as James "Mac" Mackreides
 Shuya Sophia Cai as Meiying
 Page Kennedy as DJ
 Skyler Samuels
 Sergio Peris-Mencheta
 Wu Jing

Production

Development
In April 2018, Jason Statham said a sequel to The Meg (2018) would happen if the film did well with the public, saying "I think it's like anything in this day and age – if it makes money, there's obviously an appetite to make more money. And if it doesn't do well, they'll soon sweep it under the carpet--but that's the way Hollywood works." In August 2018, Steve Alten said "My feeling has always been that this is a billion dollar franchise if it was done right. But to be done right you had to get the shark right, get the cast right, get the tone right. And Warner Bros. have nailed it completely. The producers have nailed it." In October 2018, executive producer Catherine Xujun Ying announced a sequel was in the early stages of development.

Pre-production
In March 2019, it was announced that a script for the film was in the works, with screenwriters Dean Georgaris, and Jon and Erich Hoeber returning. In his September 2020 newsletter, Alten confirmed the script, titled Meg 2: The Trench, to be complete, expressing interest in its "dark" tone and potential for an R-rating (as opposed to the first film's PG-13). In October 2020, Ben Wheatley was announced to direct.

Filming
In April 2021, Statham said filming was set to begin in January 2022, and commenced as planned at the end of January at the Warner-owned Leavesden Studios outside London, with principal photography starting on February 4, 2022. It continued there until May before switching to outdoor locations, presumably in Asia. While the production was ongoing, Sienna Guillory, Skyler Samuels, Sergio Peris-Mencheta, and Wu Jing were announced as part of the cast.

Music
Harry Gregson-Williams composed the sequel, returning from the first film.

Release
Meg 2: The Trench is scheduled to be released by Warner Bros. Pictures in the United States on August 4, 2023.

References

External links

2023 action adventure films
2020s fantasy adventure films
2023 adventure films
2023 fantasy films
2023 science fiction films
American action horror films
American action thriller films
American monster movies
American science fiction action films
American sequel films
Films about shark attacks
Films about sharks
Films based on American thriller novels
Films based on science fiction novels
Films directed by Ben Wheatley
Films produced by Lorenzo di Bonaventura
Films scored by Harry Gregson-Williams
Films shot at Warner Bros. Studios, Leavesden
Flagship Entertainment films
Giant monster films
Kaiju films
Meg series
The Meg (franchise)
Underwater action films
Upcoming sequel films
Warner Bros. films
Upcoming films
2020s English-language films
2020s American films